Fukushima-cho is a Hiroden station (tram stop) on Hiroden Main Line, located in front of Hiroshima Nishi Ward Office, Fukushima-cho 2-chome, Nishi-ku, Hiroshima.

Routes
From Fukushima-cho Station, there are two of Hiroden Streetcar routes.

 Hiroshima Station - Hiroden-miyajima-guchi Route
 Hiroden-nishi-hiroshima - Hiroshima Port Route

Connections
█ Main Line
 
Nishi-kanon-machi — Fukushima-cho — Hiroden-nishi-hiroshima

Around station
Peace Boulevard
Hiroshima Nishi-ku Ward Office

History
Opened on December 8, 1912.
Moved to the present place in September, 1964.

See also
Hiroden Streetcar Lines and Routes

Fukushima-cho Station
Railway stations in Japan opened in 1912

References